Brezany, Brežany and Břežany may refer to places:

Slovakia
Brežany, Prešov District, a municipality and village in the Prešov Region
Brežany, Žilina District, a municipality and village in the Žilina Region
Nedožery-Brezany, a municipality in the Trenčín Region

Czech Republic
Břežany (Klatovy District), a municipality and village in the Plzeň Region
Břežany (Rakovník District), a municipality and village in the Central Bohemian Region
Břežany (Znojmo District), a municipality and village in the South Moravian Region
Břežany I, a municipality and village in the Central Bohemian Region
Břežany II, a municipality and village in the Central Bohemian Region
Dolní Břežany, a municipality and village in the Central Bohemian Region
Panenské Břežany, a municipality and village in the Central Bohemian Region